Marlou Bucao Aquino (born October 7, 1972) is a Filipino former professional basketball player and assistant coach for the Bacoor City Strikers of the Maharlika Pilipinas Basketball League (MPBL). During his prime, he was known by fans as "The Skyscraper" and was, along with Dennis Espino, one-half of the so-called "Twin Towers" of the now-disbanded Sta. Lucia Realtors.

Amateur career
Although born in the province of Pangasinan, Marlou Aquino made an impact as a player in Metro Manila as he played for the Adamson Falcons in the UAAP. Marlou played in the Philippine Basketball League for the Sta. Lucia Realtors (before it joined the PBA) and Stag Pale Pilsen, and won a record-setting four PBL Most Valuable Player of the Year awards.
He was famous for his so-called "Kili-kili Shot" (a shot from under the opponent's armpit).

Professional career

Philippine Basketball Association
In 1996, he made an impact in the Philippine basketball scene. He was drafted by the Ginebra San Miguel as the first overall pick. Expectations were high for Aquino and he became a starting player in his rookie year in a team headed by Robert Jaworski.

After showing strength in performance and leading the Kings to the All-Filipino finals, he earned the nickname, "The Skyscraper" and was tag as David and Goliath with his tandem point guard teammate Bal David. At the end of the season, Marlou Aquino became the first Ginebra player since Dondon Ampalayo in 1986 to win the Rookie of the Year award. He finished the season averaging 17.9 points, 9.0 rebounds, 1.8 assist, 2.8 blocks in 40.7 minutes per contest.

In his second season, he continued his role as one of the dominant centers in the league when he took the Gordon's Gin Boars to a championship, winning the 1997 PBA Commissioner's Cup. Aquino finished the season averaging 17.9 points, 9 rebounds, and 2.8 blocks in 64 games. After two solid seasons with the La Tondeña franchise, he was traded to the Sta. Lucia Realtors for Jun Limpot and Banjo Calpito before the 2000 season.

Aquino gained his second championship ring when the Realtors captured their first-ever PBA title in 2001 by beating the San Miguel Beermen in the Governor’s Cup.

In the 2007–2008 season, he claimed his third championship during the season's Philippine Cup when Sta. Lucia defeated the Purefoods Tender Juicy Giants in seven games.

In 2010, he was acquired by the Barako Bull Energy Boosters. However, when the Energy Boosters filed a leave of absence for the 2011 PBA Commissioner's Cup, he was shortly signed by the Meralco Bolts where he eventually ended his professional basketball career.

Maharlika Pilipinas Basketball League
Aquino returned to competitive basketball after leaving the PBA. He debuted for the Bulacan Kuyas at the Maharlika Pilipinas Basketball League in February 2018.

For the league's second conference Datu Cup which kicked off on June 12, 2018, Marlou transferred to the Bacoor City Strikers.

Player profile
Aquino was a big star in the PBL for Nikon and Stag Pale Pilsen but was involved in a controversial scandal in terms of his academic status with Adamson University. After the scandal, he jumped to the pros and made big waves upon his arrival.

Aquino, known to his variety of hook shots and under-goal stab, remained a strong shot-blocker in the middle and rebounder throughout his career, making him one of the premiere centers in Philippine basketball. He was also a two-time Philippine national team member.

Awards and records
 3× PBA Champion (1997 Commissioner's Cup, 2001 Governors' Cup, 2007–08 Philippine Cup)
 PBA Defensive Player of the Year
 PBA Rookie of the Year )
 PBA Mythical First Team , 
 PBA Mythical Second Team , 
 PBA All-Defensive Team 2003, 2001, 1997, 1996
 PBA Best Player of the Conference (1996 Governors' Cup)
 PBA Finals Most Valuable Player (1997 Commissioners' Cup)
 League leader in points
 League leader in free-throws made
 League leader in offensive rebounds
 League leader in blocks
 League leader in minutes played
 League leader in 2-pointers made
 Member of the 1994 and 1998 RP National Team
 4× PBL Most Valuable Player
 Scored a career-high 38 points in 2007

References

External links
 Player Profile at PBA-Online!

1972 births
Living people
Asian Games bronze medalists for the Philippines
Asian Games medalists in basketball
Barangay Ginebra San Miguel players
Basketball players at the 1994 Asian Games
Basketball players at the 1998 Asian Games
Basketball players from Pangasinan
Maharlika Pilipinas Basketball League players
Medalists at the 1998 Asian Games
Philippines men's national basketball team players
Filipino men's basketball players
Centers (basketball)
People from Pangasinan
Sta. Lucia Realtors players
Adamson Soaring Falcons basketball players
Barangay Ginebra San Miguel draft picks